The Real World: Hawaii is the eighth season of MTV's reality television series The Real World, which focuses on a group of diverse strangers living together for several months in a different city each season, as cameras follow their lives and interpersonal relationships. It is the fourth season of The Real World to be filmed in the Pacific States region of the United States, and the first season set in the United States to be filmed outside of the contiguous United States.

The season featured seven people who lived in a modern beach house in Honolulu, Hawaii, which production started from January to May 15, 1999. The season premiered on June 15, of that year and consisted of 23 episodes.

The cast was heavily concerned with castmate Ruthie Alcaide's excessive drinking, which resulted in her leaving the house to enter an alcohol treatment program. This was cited as one of the series' memorable moments by Time magazine.

The residence
The property's two-story guest house housed the control room and production offices during the filming. At the time of the filming of the series, the Diamond Head House rented for $10,000.00 a month, and was listed for sale for $7,500,000 in 2006. By March 2008, both houses were torn down, and new building permits were issued in February 2008.

Assignment
Almost every season of The Real World, beginning with its fifth season, has included the assignment of a season-long group job or task to the housemates. The seven housemates worked at the Waikiki Location of Local Motion, a clothing and surf apparel store. They were responsible for booking in-store entertainment under a company they christened "7 Strangers Productions."

Cast

Duration of Cast 

Notes
Ruthie voluntarily left the house in Episode 13 to go to rehab.
Justin voluntarily left the house in Episode 16 due to a family emergency.
Ruthie returned to the house in Episode 18.

Episodes

After filming
After filming, MTV launched an online auction for selling the season's house items and donated the money to the Recording Artists, Actors and Athletes Against Drunk Driving.

At the 2008 The Real World Awards Bash, Amaya and Colin received a nomination for "Favorite Love Story", while Teck received one for "Biggest Playa".

Amaya went on to co-host two shows on astrology via webradio and podcast. On the Cosmic Sutra, she and a psychic discuss astrology, while Stargazing is a gossip show about how celebrities can employ astrology to their advantage.

Colin was part of the cast of the short-lived comedy television series M.Y.O.B. In 2005, he released a guide book, titled A New Ladies Man: A Complete Guide to Getting, Pleasing, and Keeping the Girl. He later went into educational leadership.

Ruthie Alcaide went on to become a singer in a band, and a lecturer on college campuses about her experiences. She has also appeared in alcohol awareness commercials on the Armed Forces Network (AFN).  Explaining her dislike of labels pertaining to her sexual orientation, she has stated that she does not like being called "straight", "gay" or "bisexual", saying, "Just call me Ruthie". In 2018, she appeared in the movie The Rainbow Bridge Motel.

Teck Holmes went on to pursue an acting career, appearing in films such as National Lampoon's Van Wilder and First Daughter, and on television series such as The Hughleys, The Parkers, Friends and NCIS. He has hosted TV shows such as MTV's Direct Effect, and the Cartoon Network game show Hole in the Wall. His group The Firemen produced a music video for their song "Smoke With Me" that played on BET.

Justin Deabler lives in Brooklyn with his husband and their son. In 2021, he published his first novel, titled Lone Stars.

The Challenge

Bold indicates the contestant was a finalist on the Challenge.

Notes

References

External links
Official site
The Real World: Hawaii: Full Episode Synopses and Recaps. MTV

Honolulu
Real World, The
1999 American television seasons
Television shows filmed in Hawaii